†Campanile giganteum is a species of exceptionally large fossil sea snail, marine gastropod molluscs in the family Campanilidae. This species dates from the Eocene epoch. It is found mostly in the Paris Basin, France.

References

External links 
 ZipcodeZoo info at: Campanile giganteum (Archived copy)
 In French, a cave in France with many of these fossils: La plage coquillière (Archived copy)
 A good image of one: Cerithium giganteum ou Campanile giganteum. Archived copy from 28 July 2016.

Campanilidae
Eocene gastropods
Paleogene gastropods of Europe
Fossil taxa described in 1804